You Wanna Dance with Me? is a remix album by American pop singer Jody Watley, released in October 1989.  The album contains remixed versions of Watley's songs.

Track listing

Personnel
Jody Watley – vocals

Production
Producers: André Cymone, Bernard Edwards, Victor Flores, François Kevorkian, Patrick Leonard, Jeff Lorber, David Z.
Remastering: Michael Hutchinson, François Kevorkian, Eric "Vietnam" Sadler, Paul Shabazz, Hank Shocklee, Louis Silas Jr.
Art direction: Lynn Robb
Design: Lynn Robb
Photography: Steven Meisel

Charts

References

External links

Jody Watley albums
Albums produced by Bernard Edwards
Albums produced by Patrick Leonard
Albums produced by André Cymone
1989 remix albums
MCA Records remix albums